Daniel Edmund Awdry  (10 September 1924 – 11 October 2008) was a British Conservative Party politician.

Awdry was educated at Winchester College and the Royal Military College, Sandhurst. He served with the 10th Hussars in Italy 1944–45 and with the Royal Wiltshire Yeomanry 1947–62. He became a solicitor and a Chippenham councillor, serving as Mayor 1958–59. He was President of the Southern Boroughs Association 1959–60.

Awdry was Member of Parliament for Chippenham from a 1962 by-election until 1979, when he stood down—having seen off strong challenges from Liberal candidates in the seat (his majority in October 1974 was 1,749 (3.3%)). His successor was Richard Needham.

References
Times Guide to the House of Commons October 1974

External links 
 
Obituary at Telegraph.co.uk

1924 births
2008 deaths
10th Royal Hussars officers
British Army personnel of World War II
Conservative Party (UK) MPs for English constituencies
Councillors in South West England
Deputy Lieutenants of Wiltshire
English solicitors
People educated at Winchester College
UK MPs 1959–1964
UK MPs 1964–1966
UK MPs 1966–1970
UK MPs 1970–1974
UK MPs 1974
UK MPs 1974–1979
Royal Wiltshire Yeomanry officers
Graduates of the Royal Military College, Sandhurst
20th-century English lawyers